Naringin dihydrochalcone, sometimes abbreviated to naringin DC, is an artificial sweetener derived from naringin, a bitter compound  found in citrus.

Naringin dihydrochalcone is a phloretin glycoside discovered at the same time as neohesperidin dihydrochalcone during the 1960s as part of a United States Department of Agriculture research program to find methods for minimizing the taste of bitter flavorants in citrus juices. 

When naringin is treated with potassium hydroxide or another strong base, and then catalytically hydrogenated, it becomes a dihydrochalcone that is roughly 300–1800 times sweeter than sugar at threshold concentrations.

References

External links

Sugar substitutes
Dihydrochalcone glycosides